Morbillivirus is a genus of viruses in the order Mononegavirales, in the family Paramyxoviridae. Humans, dogs, cats, cattle, seals, and cetaceans serve as natural hosts. This genus includes seven species. Diseases in humans associated with viruses classified in this genus include measles; in animals, they include acute febrile respiratory tract infection. In 2013, a wave of increased death among the Common bottlenose dolphin population was attributed to morbillivirus.

Genus

Structure

Morbillivirions are enveloped, with spherical geometries. Their diameter is around 150 nm. 
Genomes are linear, around 15-16 kb in length. The genome codes for eight proteins.

Life cycle
Viral replication is cytoplasmic. Entry into the host cell is achieved by virus attaching to host cell. Replication follows the negative-stranded RNA virus replication model. Negative-stranded RNA virus transcription, using polymerase stuttering, through co-transcriptional RNA editing is the method of transcription. Translation takes place by leaky scanning. The virus exits the host cell by budding.
Humans, cattle, dogs, cats, and cetaceans serve as the natural hosts. Transmission routes are respiratory.

References

External links

 ICTV Report: Paramyxoviridae
 Viralzone: Morbillivirus
 Virus Pathogen Database and Analysis Resource (ViPR): Paramyxoviridae

Morbilliviruses
Virus genera